Castaldi is a surname. Notable people with the surname include:

Alfa Castaldi (1926–1995), Italian photographer
Bellerofonte Castaldi (1580–1649), Italian composer, poet and lutenist
Benjamin Castaldi (born 1970), French television host, columnist, radio host and producer
Ettore Castaldi (1877–1956), Italian painter
Filippo Castaldi (circa 1710–1785), Italian portrait painter
Gerolamo Castaldi (died 1521), Roman Catholic prelate who served as Bishop of Massa Lubrense
Jean-Pierre Castaldi (born 1944), French actor
Luigi Castaldi (1890–1945), Italian anatomist
María Itatí Castaldi (born 1966), Argentinian basketball player
Panfilo Castaldi (c. 1398 – c. 1490), Italian physician and master of the art of printing
Vincenzo Castaldi (1916–1970), Italian chess master
Yves Castaldi, French fashion designer

See also 
Castaldo